S. minutus  may refer to:
 Sorex minutus, the Eurasian pygmy shrew or pygmy shrew, a widespread mammal species of northern Eurasia
 Strongylognathus minutus, an insect species endemic to Turkmenistan

See also
 List of Latin and Greek words commonly used in systematic names#M